Hassell can refer to:

 Hassell (surname)
 Hassell, North Carolina, United States
 Hassell Creek, a river in Tennessee, United States
 Hassell National Park, a national park in Australia
 Hassell (architecture firm), a multidisciplinary design practice based in Australia